Rafael Vargas-Suarez (born 1972), more commonly known as Vargas-Suarez Universal, is a contemporary artist living and working in Brooklyn, New York.  Born in Mexico City, Vargas-Suarez was raised in the Houston suburb of Clear Lake City, adjacent to the Johnson Space Center.  From 1991 to 1996 he studied astronomy and art history at the University of Texas at Austin  and moved to New York City in 1997.

He is primarily known for large-scale wall drawings, paintings, drawings, and photographs that draw inspiration from architecture, astronomy, biology, and medicine.

His work has been or is currently featured in numerous exhibits, such as the Hudson River Museum in Yonkers, New York, the Jersey City Museum in Jersey City, New Jersey, the Thomas Erben Gallery in New York City, the Galeria Ramis Barquet in Monterrey, Mexico, and the Galeria Carlos Irizarry in San Juan, Puerto Rico.

References

External links
Homepage
ART REVIEW; A View of Outer Space? No, It's Just of Jersey City (2003-12-28), The New York Times by Benjamin Genocchio
ART REVIEW; Bringing the Outdoors Inside and Hanging It on the Walls (2005-03-20), The New York Times by Benjamin Genocchio

1972 births
Living people
American artists of Mexican descent
20th-century American painters
American photographers
21st-century American painters